This is a list of foreshocks and aftershocks of the 2011 Tōhoku earthquake.  Japan had experienced 900 aftershocks after the M9.1 earthquake on March 11, 2011 with about 60 aftershocks being over magnitude 6.0 and three over magnitude 7.0. For conciseness, only earthquakes with magnitudes greater than 7.0 or an intensity greater than lower-6 on the shindo scale are listed here. Mw refers to the moment magnitude scale, while Mjma, Mjma, or Mj refer to the Japan Meteorological Agency seismic intensity scale.

Foreshocks

Main shock

Aftershocks

Possibly related earthquakes 
The following earthquakes are possibly related to the 2011 Tōhoku earthquake. However, agreement toward the relationships has not been reached among the researchers.

References

USGS

Other

External links 
 About triggered earthquakes in the inland area of the Japanese archipelago (Nagoya University)

Tohoku earthquake and tsunami